State Route 116 (SR 116) is a state highway in the U.S. state of California in Sonoma County. The route runs from SR 1 on the Pacific coast near Jenner to SR 121 south of Sonoma.

Route description

SR 116 proceeds east along the north bank of the Russian River, from SR 1 to Guerneville, passing through Duncans Mills, Monte Rio, and Guernewood Park as River Road.

At the intersection of the Guerneville Bridge, the route turns southeast and passes through Forestville. River Road continues eastward as a country road towards Fulton and Santa Rosa. The section of SR 116 connecting Guerneville and Forestville is known as Pocket Canyon Road, named for the canyon it passes through. The four east-west blocks of Forestville through which 116 passes are called Front Street, but the route veers south again towards Graton and Sebastopol. Here it is called Gravenstein Highway North until the intersection with Covert Street in Sebastopol. There it undergoes another name change: Healdsburg Avenue. But it doesn't last long—heading south (right turn), it becomes North Main Street for two blocks where it intersects Bodega Highway SR 12), whereupon it becomes South Main Street. When the one-way street becomes a two-way street again, 116 is known as Gravenstein Highway South all the way to Cotati where it runs concurrently with U.S. Route 101 (US 101) as the Redwood Highway south to Petaluma. In Petaluma, Lakeville Highway takes SR 116 to Stage Gulch Road, which makes a left turn east toward Sonoma, crossing the Sonoma Mountains directly north of Tolay Lake and descending into the Sonoma Valley. In Sonoma, SR 116 runs along Arnold Drive to its terminus at SR 121 near Schellville.

SR 116 is part of the California Freeway and Expressway System, and a portion just west of US 101 is part of the National Highway System, a network of highways that are considered essential to the country's economy, defense, and mobility by the Federal Highway Administration. SR 116 is eligible to be included in the State Scenic Highway System,; however, it is only a scenic highway as designated by Caltrans from SR 1 to the Sebastopol city limit, meaning that it is a substantial section of highway passing through a "memorable landscape" with no "visual intrusions", where the potential designation has gained popular favor with the community.

Major intersections

See also

References

External links

California @ AARoads.com - State Route 116
Caltrans: Route 116 highway conditions
California Highways: SR 116

State Route 116
116
116
Sebastopol, California
Petaluma, California